Charles Frazier Stanley (born 1932) is Pastor Emeritus of First Baptist Church in Atlanta, Georgia, after serving as senior pastor for 49 years. He is the founder and president of In Touch Ministries, which widely broadcasts his sermons through television and radio. He also served two one-year terms as president of the Southern Baptist Convention, from 1984 to 1986.

Early life and education
Stanley was born on September 25, 1932, in Dry Fork, Pittsylvania County, Virginia. His father, also named Charles, died nine months later. Stanley grew up in rural Dry Fork on the outskirts of Danville. At the age of 12, he became a born-again Christian, and at age 14 he began his life's work in Christian ministry.

He studied at University of Richmond  and earned a Bachelor of Arts, then he studied at Southwestern Baptist Theological Seminary in Fort Worth and earned a Master of Divinity. He has also earned a Master of Theology and a Doctor of Theology degree from Luther Rice Seminary in Florida (now located in Lithonia, Georgia).

Ministry
Stanley joined the staff of First Baptist Church of Atlanta in 1969 and became senior pastor in 1971.

In 1972, Stanley launched a half-hour religious television program called The Chapel Hour. In 1977, Stanley founded In Touch Ministries with the mission to lead people worldwide into a growing relationship with Jesus Christ and to strengthen the local church. The Christian Broadcasting Network began televising In Touch in 1978. The show has since been translated in 50 languages. In the United States, In Touch is broadcast on approximately 500 radio stations, 300 television stations, and several satellite networks, including The Inspiration Network (INSP) and Trinity Broadcasting Network. Stanley's sermons, along with other audio and video programming, are available on the In Touch website. The ministry also publishes In Touch magazine. In Touch uses tools like radio, television, magazines and digital media to advance the Gospel as quickly as possible. Stanley took the ministry name In Touch from a Living Bible he owned.

Stanley's writings and broadcasts address issues such as finances, parenting, personal crises, emotional matters, relationships, and Protestantism. According to the In Touch website, "Dr. Stanley fervently believes the Bible to be the inerrant Word of God, a belief strongly reflected in his teaching."

In 1985, Charles Stanley was elected president of the Southern Baptist Convention.

In 2005, Stanley invited Lisa Ryan to co-host a question-and-answer segment called "Bring It Home", which aired after his on-air sermon, a segment intended to help the audience better grasp the content of the sermon through questions the average listener might ask. Ryan's participation ended in late 2006, the segment continuing with Stanley alone. In early 2007, Stanley began using the final segment of the In Touch TV and radio programs to teach on his "30 Life Principles".

In 2017, Stanley named Anthony George to succeed him as senior pastor of First Baptist Church at some point in the future. On September 13, 2020, Stanley announced his retirement as senior pastor and transition to pastor emeritus. However, Stanley has made it very clear he does not believe in retirement, so he will be continuing to work at In Touch Ministries.

Influences and theology
With regard to theology, Stanley is an evangelical, and in terms of eschatology (end times) views, has been described as a dispensationalist. Over the course of his ministry, Stanley developed "30 Life Principles", that have guided his life and helped him grow in his knowledge, service, and love of God, principles that he shares these often, including in books, Bibles and study guides. He credits his grandfather, George Washington Stanley, with inspiring one of his most referenced principles: “Obey God and leave all the consequences to Him.” In his book Courageous Faith: My Story from a Life of Obedience, Stanley said, “Granddad told me, ‘Charles, if God tells you to run your head through a brick wall, you head for the wall, and when you get there, God will make a hole for it.’” Stanley also addressed his influences and philosophy when he wrote, in 2009, that he "began to apply the principles of [Napoleon Hill's Think and Grow Rich] to my endeavors as a pastor, and I discovered they worked! ... For years, I read [it] every year to remind myself that the truth of God is not just for one career field. It is for all manner of work and ministry."

Personal life
Charles F Stanley has a daughter named Becky, whom Stanley has occasionally mentioned in his sermons. Stanley's son, Andy, is the pastor of North Point Community Church in nearby Alpharetta, Georgia.

In addition to his work in Christian ministry, Stanley is an avid photographer. Much of his photographic work is featured in the In Touch magazine, as well as in other materials printed by the ministry, such as the In Touch wall and desk calendars.

Stanley's wife of more than 40 years, Anna J. Stanley, filed for divorce on June 22, 1993, following their separation in spring of 1992. The two of them agreed that Anna would amend the lawsuit to seek a legal separation instead ("separate maintenance"), while seeking reconciliation. She again filed for divorce on March 20, 1995. Even though this was not the end of the marriage, the Moody Radio Network station in Atlanta (then-WAFS) took Stanley's daily broadcast off the air during that time, as managers concluded that there was no sign of reconciliation. The Stanleys were legally separated at the time that divorce papers were filed for the last time on February 16, 2000. A judge signed the final divorce decree on May 11, 2000.

Their divorce caused a minor controversy in the Southern Baptist Convention. The matter was complicated by reports that Stanley had said he would resign as pastor if he became divorced. At the time of their separation, he stated that he did not believe that it would result in divorce; however, when it did, the members of his church overwhelmingly voted to keep him on as pastor. According to First Baptist Atlanta's bylaws, Stanley was allowed to remain as pastor as long as he did not remarry.

Anna J. Stanley died on November 10, 2014.

Bibliography
1980: Making The Bible Clear with Fred L. Lowery 
1982: Handle With Prayer 
1985: How to Listen to God 
1985: Confronting Casual Christianity 
1986: How to Keep Your Kids on Your Team 
1989: How to Handle Adversity 
1990: Eternal Security: Can You Be Sure? 
1991: The Gift of Forgiveness 
1992: The Wonderful Spirit-Filled Life 
1995: The Love of God 
1995: The Source of My Strength 
1999: A Touch of His Power: Meditations on God's Awesome Power 
2000: Success God's Way 
2000: Into His Presence: An In Touch Devotional 
2001: The Gift of Love 
2001: Our Unmet Needs 
2002: Walking Wisely 
2002: Winning the War Within 
2003: Finding Peace 
2003: God Is in Control 
2004: When the Enemy Strikes 
2005: Charles Stanley's Life Principles Bible 
2005: Living in the Power of the Holy Spirit 
2005: Living the Extraordinary Life: 9 Principles to Discover It 
2006: Discover Your Destiny  
2006: Pathways to His Presence: A Daily Devotional 
2007: Landmines in the Path of the Believer: Avoiding the Hidden Dangers  
2008: In Step with God 
2008: Stuck in Reverse  
2008: The Power of God's Love: A 31 Day Devotional to Encounter the Father's Greatest Gift 
2008: When Your Children Hurt 
2010: How to Reach Your Full Potential for God 
2011: Turning the Tide: Real Hope Real Change 
2012: Prayer: The Ultimate Conversation 
2013: Man of God: Leading Your Family by Allowing God to Lead You 
2013: Emotions: Confront the Lies. Conquer with Truth. 
2013: Walking with God: Thoughts on His Indwelling Spirit, Volume 2 
2014: Walking with God: Knowing God Through Prayer, Volume 3 
2015: Waiting on God: Strength for Today and Hope for Tomorrow 
2015: Christmas: The Gift for Every Heart 
2016: Courageous Faith: My Story from a Life of Obedience 
2017: Finding God’s Blessings in Brokenness: How Pain Reveals His Deepest Love 
2017: Standing Strong: How to Storm-Proof Your Life with God’s Timeless Truths

Television

Awards and honors
1988: National Religious Broadcaster’s Hall of Fame
1989: Named Clergyman of the Year by Religious Heritage of America 
1989: NRB named In Touch with Television Producer of the Year
1999: In Touch named Radio Program of the Year 
2017: Thomas Nelson Publishing recognizes Stanley for selling more than 3.5 million copies of his books

See also
 List of Southern Baptist Convention affiliated people

References

External links
 In Touch Ministries – Charles Stanley's Biography
 Beliefnet – Interview with Charles Stanley
 First Baptist Atlanta
 The 30 "Life Principles" developed by Charles F. Stanley to help people live life at its best.

1932 births
Living people
20th-century American non-fiction writers
20th-century Baptist ministers from the United States
21st-century American non-fiction writers
21st-century Baptist ministers from the United States
American Christian writers
American evangelicals
American radio personalities
American television evangelists
Baptist writers
Baptists from Georgia (U.S. state)
Luther Rice University alumni
People from Atlanta
People from Danville, Virginia
People from Pittsylvania County, Virginia
Southern Baptist Convention presidents
Southern Baptist ministers
Southwestern Baptist Theological Seminary alumni
University of Richmond alumni
20th-century American male writers
American male non-fiction writers
Baptists from Virginia
21st-century American male writers